Kassahun Ayele Tesemma (born June 17, 1949) is a retired Ethiopian diplomat.
 From 1973 to 1983 he was an engineer at the sugar factory in Metehara.
 From 1983 to 1984 he was a member of the group of technical experts  n Sugar .
 From 1984 to 1992 he was working as an engineer in the service of industrial projects.
 From 1992 to 1993 he served as director general of the Authority Project Development Studies.
 From July 1 and August 1993 he was responsible for the Office of Production Services and Support in the Office of the Prime Minister.
 In 1994 he was appointed member of the Central Committee of the Amhara National Democratic Movement.
 From August 1995 to June 19, 2002 was Minister of Trade and Industry.
 On March 26, 2002 was appointed ambassador to Washington, D.C., where he was accredited from June 19, 2002 to May 15, 2006.

References

1949 births
Living people
Ambassadors of Ethiopia to the United States
Ambassadors of Ethiopia to Germany